Hydaphias is a genus of true bugs belonging to the family Aphididae.

The species of this genus are found in Europe.

Species:
 Hydaphias carpaticae Mamontova-Solukha, 1966 
 Hydaphias helvetica Hille Ris Lambers, 1947

References

Aphididae